The angon (Medieval Greek , Old High German ango, Old English anga "hook, point, spike") was a type of javelin used during the Early Middle Ages by the Anglo-Saxons, Franks, Goths, and other Germanic peoples. It was similar to, and probably derived from, the pilum used by the Roman army and had a barbed head and long narrow socket or shank made of iron mounted on a wooden haft.

It was rare on the battlefield, despite the claim by the Greek historian Agathias, being found mostly in the grave goods of the wealthy. The Fragmentary Chronicle of Saragossa credits an ango with killing King Amalaric of the Visigoths. By the 7th century it had ceased to be used. It also went out of fashion, together with other forms of throwing spears and javelins, in Francia, by the early 7th century.

They are found in abundance in war-graves in Illerup-Ådal, Denmark. They are also quite common in Norwegian graves from the Migration Era. In Finland, a local version of the weapon was popular during the Early Middle Ages.

Although not very frequent in the Baltic countries, examples have also been found at various sites in Estonia, including burial sites at Sõrve and Hinniala.

Description
The barbs were designed to lodge in an opponent's shield (or body) so that it could not be removed and the long iron shank prevented the head from being cut from the shaft. The angon was likely designed for the purpose of disabling enemy shields, thus leaving combatants vulnerable, and disrupting enemy formations. The shaft may sometimes have been decorated or painted, and iron or bronze rings were sometimes fitted onto it which may have marked the center of balance and thus the best place to hold the weapon.

Use

Before the battle lines joined and warriors engaged in hand to hand combat, they would attempt to thin the enemy ranks with ranged weapons. This would begin with archery, followed by an exchange of javelins and throwing axes prior to closing. The scholar Agathias recorded the use of angons by Frankish warriors at the Battle of Casilinum in 554:

The poem recording the Battle of Maldon in Essex, England, in 991 AD, describes an encounter between the earl Byrhtnoth and a group of Norsemen in which an exchange of javelins is made before the warriors draw their swords and engage in close combat.

The maximum effective range of the angon and other javelins was probably  depending on the length and weight of the weapon and the skill of the thrower. It is not known to have been used in war beyond the 7th century, but during the 16th century it was used sporadically for hunting.

See also
Anglo-Saxon warfare
Shield wall
Halberd

References

External links
Image of an angon at Armes Glossaire
Weapons and Warfare at Regia Anglorum

Ancient weapons
Germanic weapons
Javelins